Rocket 3 may refer to:

 Triumph Rocket III, a motorcycle by Triumph Motorcycles Ltd
 Triumph Rocket 3, the successor of Triumph Rocket III
 BSA Rocket 3/Triumph Trident, a motorcycle by Triumph Engineering
 A rocket by Astra, see Rocket 3